Nõo is a small borough in Tartu County, in southern Estonia. It's located about 15 km southwest of the city of Tartu by the Tartu–Valga–Riga railway and the European route E264 (also known as Via Hanseatica). Nõo is the administrative centre of Nõo Parish. As of 2011 Census, the settlement's population was 1,492.

Nõo was first mentioned in 1319 as Nughen and as a separate church parish in 1483, during the times when it belonged to the Bishopric of Dorpat. Nõo St. Laurence Lutheran Church is believed to have been built around the 1250s to 1260s.

According to Bengt Gottfried Forselius schooling took place in Nõo already in 1686. Since 1688 a local parish school has been working in Nõo. In 1953 the primary school was reorganized as a secondary school. In 1965 a computing centre was established, the school was given the first school computer in the USSR – the Ural-1. In 1994 Nõo school was separated into Nõo Secondary Science Gymnasium and Nõo Primary School.

Notable people
Jaak Järv (1852–1920), writer and journalist; worked as a teacher in Nõo school
Helen Klaos (Helen Reino, born 1983), badminton player
Juhan Kotkas (1878–1963), violist and composer; was born in Nõo
Aleksander Läte (1860–1948), composer; worked at the Nõo school 1883–1900
Martin Lipp (1854–1923), poet; served as the pastor of Nõo church
Ado Reinvald (1847–1922), writer; lived in Nõo
Harald Tammur (1917–2001). Lutheran pastor of Nõo St. Lawrence Lutheran church from 1954 until 1979
Eduard Tubin (1905–1982), composer and conductor; worked as a teacher in Nõo school

Gallery

References

External links
Nõo Parish 
Tourist Information Tartu and Tartu County - Nõo 

Boroughs and small boroughs in Estonia
Kreis Dorpat